Cetrimide, or alkyltrimethylammonium bromide, is an antiseptic which is a mixture of three quaternary ammonium compounds: tetradonium bromide (TTAB or MITMAB), cetrimonium bromide (CTAB), and laurtrimonium bromide (DTAB or LTAB). It was first discovered and developed by ICI and introduced under the brand name Cetavlon. It is used as a 1-3 % solution for cleaning roadside accident wounds. ICI also introduced Savlon, which was a combination of cetrimide and chlorhexidine. ICI later sold the Savlon brand OTC to Johnson & Johnson in May 1992. Cetrimide is used in various applications such as antiseptic agents, diagnostic test and analysis, topical formulations, and dental treatment.

References

External links 

Antiseptics
Cationic surfactants